Burrow-with-Burrow is a civil parish in the English county of Lancashire.
The parish of Burrow-with-Burrow had a population of 191 recorded in the  2001 census,
 decreasing to 182 at the 2011 Census.

Settlements in the parish include Nether Burrow, Over Burrow, Overtown and Cowan Bridge.

The parish is sometimes referred to as "Burrow" for brevity.

History 
Roman pavements, altars, inscriptions, urns, and coins have been found here; and a Roman milestone is on the road.

 In 1086, the Domesday Book listed under Craven: Torntun & in Borch, Orm vi curactes ad geld. (Thornton-in-Lonsdale with Burrow-with-Burrow Orm has c720 acres /290ha of plough-land to be taxed.) That manor would also have included grazing land but since only arable land was tallied the total area can only be induced. Orm was one of the family of Norse Noblemen who held the most land in Northern England.

Burrow Hall is a large 18th-century country house set in an estate to the north of the village.

See also

Listed buildings in Burrow-with-Burrow

References

External links

GENUKI(tm) page

Civil parishes in Lancashire
Geography of the City of Lancaster